Le Monde libertaire (French: Libertarian World) is an anarchist French weekly organ of the Fédération Anarchiste. Founded in 1954, it is the direct successor of Le Libertaire which was contributed by Albert Camus, Georges Brassens, Louise Michel and André Breton.

History and profile
Le Monde libertaire was first published as a monthly magazine in October 1954. Its name is a reference to another publication called Le Libertaire, which was launched in France in 1895 by Sébastien Faure and Louise Michel. On 6 October 1977 the frequency of Le Monde libertaire was switched to weekly. The magazine is published by the Fédération Anarchiste.

Le Monde libertaire did not support the involvement of France in the war in Algeria.

References

External links
 

1954 establishments in France
Anarchist periodicals published in France
French Anarchist Federations
French-language magazines
Magazines established in 1954
Magazines published in Paris
Monthly magazines published in France
Weekly magazines published in France